Ouled Sidi Brahim is a town and commune in M'Sila Province, Algeria. According to the 2021 census it has a population of 14,499.

References

Populated places in M'Sila Province
Communes of M'Sila Province
Cities in Algeria
Algeria

fr:Ouled Sidi Brahim